Derby Litchurch Lane Works (formerly Derby Carriage and Wagon Works) is a railway rolling stock factory in Derby, England. It was opened in the 19th century by the Midland Railway. The plant has produced rolling stock under the ownership of the Midland Railway. It is now owned by Alstom.

History

Midland Railway (1876–1923)

Railway building began at Derby Works in 1840, when the North Midland Railway, the Midland Counties Railway and the Birmingham and Derby Railway set up engine sheds as part of their Tri Junct Station. When the three merged in 1844 to form the Midland Railway its first Locomotive and Carriage Superintendent Matthew Kirtley set out to organise their activities and persuaded the directors to build their own rolling stock, rather than buying it in (see Derby Works).

By the 1860s, the works had expanded to such an extent that he was considering reorganising it and, in 1873, it separated into the Midland Railway Locomotive Works, known locally as "The Loco", and a new Carriage and Wagon Works further south, off Litchurch Lane, locally known as the "Carriage and Wagon". This was completed by his successor Samuel Waite Johnson, under the control of Thomas Gethin Clayton The Derby Carriage and Wagon works were built in 1876.

This meant, for instance, that the traversers at the end of each shed were still in use a century later.

Production had begun in 1873, at the original loco works, of carriages from kits supplied by the Pullman Company of Detroit in United States. These were followed by Clayton's own design of  coaches, which incorporated both first- and third-class accommodation, and ran on four- or six-wheeled bogies. Initially claret or dark red, with dark green locomotives, the livery of both was changed to the well-known crimson in 1883. Five layers of undercoat were used, followed by a top coat and three coats of varnish.

A six-wheeled coach built in 1885 is in the National Railway Museum. In 1879, the first bogie coaches were built for the Midland's line to Glasgow over its newly opened Settle-Carlisle line. Clayton's successor in 1903 was David Bain., the works building sleeping cars and dining coaches. In 1904 two steam motor-carriages were fitted out for the Morecambe-Heysham service.

Ten- and twelve-ton wagons were produced in quantity, starting with a set of components in the morning, each would be assembled for painting by the end of the day. Reid and E.J.H.Lemon studied American mass production methods and introduced them around 1919, raising output to 200 wagons and ten coaches a week.

In 1914 the works turned to producing supplies for the army of World War I, building ambulance trains and army wagons, plus parts for rifles.

London, Midland and Scottish Railway (1923-1948)
In 1923, the Midland Railway became part of the London, Midland and Scottish Railway, and W. R. Reid was appointed Carriage & Wagon Superintendent. Together with the LNWR's Wolverton works, new coaches were built to the Midland design, corridor coaches with doors to each compartment - the so-called "all-doors". These were still in use until nearly 1960, particularly on the Liverpool and Newcastle to Bristol expresses.

Around 1929, the compartment doors, however, were replaced by two fixed lights, and later with single large windows. All-wood construction gave way to steel panels. In the next decade the Works Superintendent, Ernest Pugson, realised the potential of the new technology of metallic arc welding, replacing many forged and cast components. He introduced the first composite welded steel/timber bodies with standardised jig-built components. The first open carriages, referred to as "vestibule coaches", also appeared. From 1933, roofs were of steel rather than wood, with a simplified livery and a smoother external appearance, and, at the end of the 1930s all-welded steel vehicles were built for the Liverpool and Southport electric service, the Class 502.

During World War II, Derby pioneered aeroplane wing production methods, by 1945 having produced over 4,000. With the loco works, wings and fuselages were repaired and sent to a private contractor at Nottingham for assembly, initially of Hampden bombers but later of other aircraft including Lancasters.

Although towards the end of the 'thirties a complete 'Coronation Scot' train was built for an exhibition tour in America and a streamlined all-welded three coach railcar, most of the all-steel carriages were made by outside manufacturers. After the war, the LMS began to produce its own, the so-called "porthole" stock with round windows to the lavatory compartment. After nationalisation in 1948, as the main carriage works of the London Midland Region, the first Mk I all-steel carriages were produced.

British Railways and BREL (1948–1989)

The works became the principal rolling stock works of the London Midland Region of British Railways at nationalisation in 1948; the steel British Railways Mark 1 carriage was developed in the 1950s, and at the beginning of the 1950s the works employed over 5,000 people.

In 1953, the works began production of Derby Lightweight DMUs; units of aluminium construction. The use of glass fibre laminate was introduced for the roof ends.

Trailer cars were also built for the London Transport Executive as replacements on the London Underground Piccadilly line. In 1956, all-steel DMUs, the "Derby Heavyweights" were introduced, with over a thousand being built in that decade.

From 1958, the new Class 108 of Derby Lightweights was produced in quantity. A number of steel-bodied Class 107 DMUs were built in 1960 for lines in Scotland.

In 1969, the works were transferred to new subsidiary British Rail Engineering Ltd and renamed Derby Litchurch Lane Works. Wagon building and repairs ended, with a major re-organisation of the carriage and railcar work, and in 1979 container production finished.

In 1984, British Rail was under extreme financial pressure to close branch lines. At the same time a worldwide need was seen for a low-cost rail vehicle. The Research Division and British Leyland together produced a lightweight four-wheeled vehicle which they referred to as LEV-1. After proving trials, which included assessment on the Boston and Maine Railroad in America, it was developed into the Class 140 which led to a series of two-car Pacer units, and around 150 of various classes were built.

Post-privatisation (1989–present)

BREL was privatised in 1989, the same year the Class 158 started build at the works, and became wholly owned by Asea Brown Boveri (ABB) in 1992, the works becoming part of Adtranz (1996), and in 2001 part of Bombardier Transportation. In January 2021 Alstom became the new owner when they acquired the worldwide business of Bombardier Transportation.

One of the first orders in 1993 was for Class 482 EMUs for the Waterloo and City Line. In 1995, a number of Class 325 parcels EMUs were built. However, this period was characterised by large contracts and rushes of work, interspersed with periods of relative idleness and layoffs. The works kept going by refurbishing ex-Southern Region slam-door stock.

In 1997, a contract was received to supply the new Class 168 "Clubman" DMU, which led to the various Turbostar DMUs and Electrostar EMUs, now the most widely used trains in Britain.

In 2004, the plant was retained as part of Bombardier's manufacturing capacity in Europe after restructuring by the company led to closure of seven of its European facilities. The site had previously considered a possibility for closure, and had an order gap between the end of the Electrostar contract (for train operators SouthCentral and Southeastern) until 2008 when a major £3.4billion contract of over 1,700 carriages for Metronet was to begin. The order gap was bridged by an order for Electrostars for the Gautrain project in South Africa won in 2006; the first 15 vehicles were delivered complete, and the remaining 81 in kit form for assembly at Union Carriage & Wagon's plant in Nigel, South Africa.

After the closure of Alstom's Washwood Heath plant in 2005, Bombardier's Derby plant was the only passenger rolling stock manufacturer in the UK.

In 2009, Bombardier received a contract to build thirty Class 379 EMUs for National Express services including Stansted Express.

By mid-2011, Derby had completed construction of EMUs for the 2009 Stock and Class 379 EMUs and was completing an order of Class 172 Turbostar DMUs. The plant had a large order of 1,400 S stock trains for London Underground which was completed in 2017.

In 2011, Bombardier was expecting to lay off approximately 1,200 workers at the plant, irrespective of future orders, and the contract for the Thameslink Programme was seen by Bombardier's management as critical to the continued viability of the plant and related supply chain. After Siemens was named preferred bidder in June 2011 to construct the new rolling stock for Thameslink services through London, Bombardier announced it was to cut 1,400 out of the 3,000 jobs at Derby.

Colin Walton, chairman of Bombardier Transportation in the UK, said the loss of the contract had forced the company to review its UK operations. On 28 December 2011, Bombardier won a £188million contract to produce 130 carriages for Southern. By February 2012 the plant had reduced its workforce to approximately 1,600 and it revived again in 2014 with orders from Gatwick Express and Crossrail.

In 2019 Bombardier announced 400 new jobs at the plant in Derby for the production of hundreds of carriages for Greater Anglia, South Western Railway and West Midlands Trains.

In January 2021, Alstom acquired Bombardier Transportation for €5.1billion taking over its operations, including the Derby site and its rolling stock designs such as the Aventra and Electrostar.

The end stage of the rolling stock will be done at Derby and Alstom's Crewe works with the first stage of production being done at the Hitachi Newton Aycliffe facility.

See also
 LMS railcars
 Listed buildings in Alvaston

Notes

References

Bibliography
 Larkin, E.J., Larkin, J.G., (1988) The Railway Workshops of Great Britain 1823-1986, Macmillan Press
 Billson, P., (1996) Derby and the Midland Railway, Breedon Books

Further reading

 Robertson, K., (2004) First Generation DMUs, Ian Allan Publishing
 Marsden, C.J., (1989) Twenty Five Years of Railway Research, Haynes Publishing Co.

Midland Railway
London, Midland and Scottish Railway
Rail transport in Derby
Railway workshops in Great Britain
Bombardier Transportation
Rolling stock manufacturers of the United Kingdom